Euryn is a masculine given name and place name.

Origin and meaning 
Euryn means "gold trinket or jewel" and derives from the Welsh word "Aur" (gold).

Notable people 
  (1942–2021), Welsh broadcaster, presenter and writer

See also
 Euryn

References 

Masculine given names
Welsh masculine given names